Orbital  may refer to:

Sciences

Chemistry and physics
 Atomic orbital
 Molecular orbital
 Hybrid orbital

Astronomy and space flight
 Orbit
 Earth orbit

Medicine and physiology
 Orbit (anatomy), also known as the orbital bone
 Orbitofrontal cortex, a part of the brain used for decision making

Business
 Orbital Corporation, an Australian engine technology company
 Orbital Sciences Corporation, a U.S. satellite launch and defense systems corporation
 Orbital ATK, American aerospace manufacturer formed from the merger of Orbital Sciences Corporation and parts of Alliant Techsystems

Transportation
 Ring road (or orbital road in some regions)
 Orbital (metro), a rapid transit line usually encircling a city centre
 Orbital engine

Other uses
 Orbital (The Culture), artificial worlds from Iain M. Banks's series of science fiction novels, the Culture
 Orbital (band), an English electronic dance music duo
 Orbital (1991 album) 
 Orbital (1993 album)
 Orbital (comics), a Franco-Belgian science fiction comics series
 Orbital piercing

See also
 Orbit (disambiguation)